Henry Richard Edwards (20 July 1861 – 22 June 1921) was an English cricketer.  Edwards' batting and bowling styles are unknown.  He was born at Hackney, London.  He was registered at birth as Harry Richard Edwards.

Edwards made a single first-class appearance for Sussex against Lancashire at the County Ground, Hove in 1885.  He was dismissed for a duck twice in this match.  He was dismissed by Johnny Briggs in Sussex's first-innings, while in their second-innings he was dismissed by Dick Barlow.  This was his only major appearance for Sussex.

He died at Hackney, London on 22 June 1921.

References

External links
Henry Edwards at ESPNcricinfo
Henry Edwards at CricketArchive

1861 births
1921 deaths
People from Hackney Central
English cricketers
Sussex cricketers